The 1948 Italian Grand Prix was a Grand Prix motor race held at Valentino Park in Turin, Italy on 5 September 1948. It was won by French driver Jean-Pierre Wimille in an Alfa Romeo 158.

Classification

References
http://www.silhouet.com/motorsport/archive/f1/nc/1948/1948.html#italia
http://www.statsf1.com/en/1948-hc/grand-prix-38.aspx

Italian Grand Prix
Italian Grand Prix
Grand Prix